The Southern Mallee Giants Football Club is an Australian rules football club which competes in the Wimmera Football League (WFL). It is based in the town of Hopetoun, Victoria.

History

The club was the result of a merger of the Hopetoun and the Beulah football clubs in 2014 and competed in the last year of the Mallee Football League in 2015. The league was reduced to five clubs and was deemed uneconomical to continue.

The club was accepted into the Horsham District Football League for the 2016 season.| Southern Mallee It won the premiership and again the following years. Its two years saw it undefeated with a winning streak of 36 games.
Deemed to strong for the local competition the Southern Mallee Giants joined the Wimmera Football League in 2018.

Premierships
 Horsham District Football League
 2016, 2017

Publication
Wheatbelt Warriors. A Tribute To Wimmera Football League.

References

Wimmera Football League clubs